Martha Elizabeth Andresen Wilder (1944 – 2018) was an American scholar of Renaissance literature. She taught at Pomona College, where she was the Phebe Estelle Spalding Professor of English.

References

Shakespearean scholars
Pomona College faculty
1944 births
2018 deaths